Space For Humanity, also known as S4H, is a non-profit organization with headquarters in Denver, Colorado. Founded in 2017 by Dylan Taylor, Space for Humanity is organizing a sponsored Citizen Astronaut Program, where leaders can apply for an opportunity to go to space and experience the Overview Effect: the cognitive shift in awareness that occurs when a human being looks down on the Earth from space.

History
Space For Humanity was launched at Space Frontier's NewSpace 2017 conference with a stated mission to "send 10,000 diverse humans to space within the next ten years and so doing change human perception, democratize space, and improve the state of the World."

Alliance Network 
Space for Humanity’s Alliance Network is a collective of advisors, ambassadors, partners, and their Inclusion Council that have come together to advance the Space for Humanity mission.

Partnerships 
Space for Humanity has a partnership with stratospheric balloon company, The Space Perspective.

Other Partnerships/Organizations include:

 We the Future
 New York Space Alliance
 BOSPlanet
 LifeShip
 SGAC
 SEDS
 Conrad Challenge

Programs

Humanity-1: Citizen Astronaut Program 
Space for Humanity is to launch the planet's first Sponsored Citizen Astronaut Program to send citizens of diverse racial, economic, and disciplinary backgrounds into space on Humanity-1. S4H has opened an application process for leaders, from any walk of life, to apply for an opportunity to go to space. Applications are being collected for spaceflight seats in 2021.

Planning and Mission 
In 2019, Space for Humanity began to accept applications from citizens around the world to travel to space as soon as flights are commercially available. In July 2021, Space for Humanity reopened the application for the program for sponsoring a group of leaders to join the program.

The end goal of this program is to inspire leaders with a new perspective from the Overview Effect to bring back to the world.

Awards
 Voted among the Top 10 companies at NewSpace People (2017)

See also
 Commercialization of space
 Private spaceflight 
 NewSpace
 Space Tourism

References

External links
 

Organizations established in 2017
Organizations based in Denver